The Cave of Adullam was originally a stronghold referred to in the Old Testament, near the town of Adullam, where future King David sought refuge from King Saul.

The word "cave" is usually used but "fortress", which has a similar appearance in writing, is used as well. Wilhelm Gesenius' work Hebrew and Chaldee Lexicon to the Old Testament Scriptures provides notes supporting Adullam as meaning "a hiding place". Brown, Driver, and Briggs' Hebrew and English Lexicon of the Old Testament cite the Arabic word 'adula to mean "turn aside" and suggest Adullam to mean "retreat, refuge".

During this period, David passed up several opportunities to kill Saul, who in turn was attempting to kill his young rival, whose followers believed had been chosen by God to succeed King Saul. David refused to fight unethically, for instance when he had an opportunity to kill Saul in his sleep. According to the Old Testament, God honored David's high ethical standards and soon King David and his men, who had once hidden in the Cave of Adullam, were known throughout Israel for their deeds of valor.

Non-biblical usage
The term "Cave of Adullam" has been used by political commentators referring to any small group remote from power but planning to return. Thus in Walter Scott's 1814 novel Waverley when the Jacobite rising of 1745 marches south through England, the Jacobite Baron of Bradwardine welcomes scanty recruits while remarking that they closely resemble David's followers at the Cave of Adullam; "videlicet, every one that was in distress, and every one that was in debt, and every one that was discontented".

See also
Psalm 142, "a prayer when he (David) was in the cave".

References

Caves of Israel
David
Hebrew Bible places
Walter Scott